D. sylvestris may refer to:
 Dipsacus sylvestris, a synonym for Dipsacus fullonum, the Fuller's teasel or wild teasel, a flowering plant species
 Dysgonia sylvestris, a synonym for Bastilla absentimacula, a moth species
 Dolichovespula sylvestris, a eusocial wasp species in the family Vespidae.

See also
 Sylvestris (disambiguation)